This is a list of protected areas of Newfoundland and Labrador.

National parks
 Gros Morne National Park
 Terra Nova National Park
 Torngat Mountains National Park
 Mealy Mountains National Park Reserve

Provincial parks

The Government of Newfoundland and Labrador Environment and Conservation Department, Parks and Natural Areas Division maintains a number of full-use, day use and natural scenic attraction parks, as well as a set of Provincial Park Reserves in both the island and mainland portions of the province.

The T'Railway Provincial Park follows the abandoned Newfoundland Railway line from St. John's to Channel-Port aux Basques.

14 of the 22 provincial parks provide a variety of day use and camping facilities.

Provincial Park Reserves 

The provincial park reserves protect significant natural features or landscapes, and provide no day use or camping facilities.  Many of these parks are the remaining landmass of former provincial parks privatized in 1995 or 1997, excluding campground space leased or sold to private operators or closed.

 Bellevue Beach Provincial Park Reserve - Bellevue
 Duley Lake Provincial Park Reserve - Labrador City
 Fitzgeralds Pond Provincial Park Reserve - Dunville, NL
 Flatwater Pond Provincial Park Reserve - Baie Verte
 Grand Codroy Provincial Park Reserve - Doyles
 Grand Lake Provincial Park Reserve - Goose Bay
 Jack's Pond Provincial Park Reserve - Arnold's Cove
 Jipujijkuei Kuespem Provincial Park Reserve - Morrisville
 Jonathan's Pond Provincial Park Reserve - Gander
 Marine Drive Provincial Park Reserve - Pouch Cove
 Windmill Bight Provincial Park Reserve - Lumsden

Wilderness and Ecological Reserves 
These provincial reserves are intended to protect wilderness areas and wildlife habitat. They were created under the terms of the Wilderness and Ecological Reserves Act (WER Act) of 1980. With the exception of Burnt Cape, Cape St. Mary's, Mistaken Point, and Witless Bay, these areas contain few facilities and provide limited access to the public.

 Avalon Wilderness Reserve
 Baccalieu Island Ecological Reserve
 Bay du Nord Wilderness Reserve
 Burnt Cape Ecological Reserve
 Cape St. Mary's Ecological Reserve
 Fortune Head Ecological Reserve
 Funk Island Ecological Reserve
 Gannet Islands Ecological Reserve
 Hare Bay Islands Ecological Reserve
 Hawke Hill Ecological Reserve
 King George IV Ecological Reserve
 Little Grand Lake Provisional Ecological Reserve
 Mistaken Point Ecological Reserve
 Redfir Lake - Kapitagas Channel Ecological Reserve
 Table Point Ecological Reserve
 Watts Point Ecological Reserve
 West Brook Ecological Reserve
 Witless Bay Ecological Reserve

Privatization 

Between 1995 and 1997, due to rising debt, the provincial government embarked on a program to reduce expenses in the Parks and Recreation system by privatizing a number of Provincial Parks and Natural and Scenic Attractions.  This policy was controversial and was still being referenced negatively in debates in the Provincial House of Assembly as late as 2004.

The privatization initiative was intended to retain the level of parks and recreational areas available to residents of and tourists in the province, while reducing the expense to the provincial government.  It is unclear how successful this was, as at least of some of the privatized properties were no longer operating as of 2001.

Parks Privatized or Closed (1997) 

These parks and natural scenic attractions were privatized or closed in a second privatization initiative in 1997.

Provincial Parks:
 Backside Pond Provincial Park - Trinity Bay
 Beothuck Provincial Park - Grand Falls-Windsor; privately owned and operating as of 2019.
 Catamaran Provincial Park - Badger; privately owned and operating as of 2019.
 David Smallwood Provincial Park - Gambo
 Flatwater Pond Provincial Park - Baie Verte
 Gushues Pond Provincial Park - Conception Bay; privately owned and operating as of 2019.
 Indian River Provincial Park - Springdale; privately run, known as Blue Canoe as of 2020.
 Northern Bay Sands - Northern Bay, Conception Bay
 Piccadilly Head Provincial Park - Port au Port
 River of Ponds Provincial Park - River of Ponds
 Sop's Arm Provincial Park - White Bay
 Square Pond Provincial Park - Gambo; privately owned and operating as of 2011.

Natural and Scenic Attractions:
 Eastport North - Glovertown
 Middle Cove - St. John's
 Pearson's Peak - Grand Falls-Windsor
 Point au Mal - Stephenville
 Point la Haye - Trepassey
 Salmon Cove Sands - Salmon Cove, Conception Bay
 Topsail Beach - St. John's

Parks Privatized or Closed (1995) 

These 29 parks were apparently privatized or closed in an initial privatization initiative in 1995.

Provincial Parks:
 Blue Ponds Provincial Park - Corner Brook; privately owned and operating as an RV park as of 2013.
 Cochrane Pond Provincial Park - St. John's; privately owned and operating as of 2013.
 Crabbes River Provincial Park - Crabbes River; privately owned and operating as an RV park as of 2013.
 Freshwater Pond Provincial Park - Marystown
 Holyrood Pond Provincial Park - St. Mary's Bay
 Jipujijkuek Kuespem Provincial Park (formerly Little River Provincial Park) - Morrisville
 Mary March Provincial Park - Buchans
 Mummichog Provincial Park - Channel-Port aux Basques
 Pipers Hole River Provincial Park - Swift Current; known to be abandoned by 2008.

Natural and Scenic Attractions and Outdoor Recreation Parks:
 Aspen Brook Provincial Park - Grand Falls-Windsor
 Black Bank Provincial Park - Barachois Brook
 Bottle Cove Provincial Park - Corner Brook
 Dog Bay Pond Provincial Park - Summerford
 Father Duffy's Well Provincial Park - Salmonier
 Glenwood Provincial Park - Gander
 French Islands Provincial Park - Burin
 Indian Cove Neck Provincial Park - Lewisporte
 Jiggin' Head Provincial Park - Summerville
 Maberly Provincial Park - Bonavista
 Northeast Arm Provincial Park - Glovertown
 Otter Bay Provincial Park - Channel-Port aux Basques
 Pasadena Beach Provincial Park - Pasadena
 Pearson's Peak Provincial Park - Grand Falls-Windsor
 Rattle Falls Provincial Park - Summerville
 Smith Sound Provincial Park - Clarenville
 South West Pond Provincial Park - Salmonier
 Stag Lake Provincial Park - Corner Brook
 Thorburn Lake Provincial Park - Clarenville
 Three Mile Lake Provincial Park - Port au Choix

See also 
 List of Canadian provincial parks
 List of National Parks of Canada

References

External links
 Government of Newfoundland and Labrador - Parks & Natural Areas Division

Newfoundland and Labrador
Protected areas